The UEFA European Under-18 Championship 1971 Final Tournament was held in Czechoslovakia.

Best player: Trevor Francis (ENG)

Best goalkeeper: António Fidalgo (POR)

Qualification

Group 1

Group 2

Group 3

Group 4

Groups 5-8

|}

Teams
The following teams entered the tournament. Eight teams qualified (Q) and eight teams entered without playing qualification matches.

 
  (Q)
  (Q)
  (host)
 
 
  (Q)
 
  (Q)
  (Q)
 
 
  (Q)
  (Q)
  (Q)

Group stage

Group A

Group B

Group C

Group D

Semifinals

Third place match

Final

External links
Results by RSSSF

UEFA European Under-19 Championship
1971
Under-18
1970–71 in Czechoslovak football
May 1971 sports events in Europe
1970s in Prague
Sports competitions in Prague
1971 in youth association football